Yousef Darwish Ghawanmeh  (1935 – 11 January 2021) was a Jordanian historian, anthropologist, professor and author.

Life
He was born in the village of Saham Al-Kefarat north of the city of Irbid. He received his elementary education in his village before moving to the city of Irbid where he graduated high school, he then earned his Bachelor's, master's and doctorate's degree from Alexandria University and his Post-Doctorate from Princeton University in the United States in 1979. His works focus on the cultural and political history of Jordan during the Islamic periods.

Ghawanmeh received several awards, including the Arab Historian Medal from the Union of Arab Historians in 1991, the State Appreciation Award in the field of social sciences in 1992 and the Order of Hussein bin Ali of the first class in 2014.

Bibliography
He published more than 30 books, including:
History of Jerusalem in the Mamluk period
Islamic scholars and jurists of Irbid in the Islamic period
Excesses of Batiniyya Shia in the Levant
Ancient Islamic mosques in Ajloun

References

1935 births
Jordanian writers
Jordanian historians
Historians of the Middle East
Writers on the Middle East
Alexandria University alumni
Princeton University alumni
2021 deaths
Academic staff of Yarmouk University